Birch's law, discovered by the geophysicist Francis Birch, establishes a linear relation between compressional wave velocity  and density  of rocks and minerals:

Example
The mean atomic mass of forsterite (Mg2SiO4) is equal to the sum of the atomic masses divided by the number of atoms in the formula:

Typical oxides and silicates in the mantle have values close to 20, while in the earth's core it is close to 50.

Applications
Birch's law applies to rocks that are under pressures of a few tens of gigapascals, enough for most cracks to close. It can be used in the discussion of geophysical data. The law is used in forming compositional and mineralogical models of the mantle by using the change in the velocity of the seismic wave and its relationship with a change in density of the material the wave is moving in. Birch's law is used in determining chemical similarities in the mantle as well as the discontinuities of the transition zones. Birch's Law can also be employed in the calculation of an increase of velocity due to an increase in the density of material.

Shortcomings
It had been previously assumed that the velocity-density relationship is constant. That is, that Birch's law will hold true in any case, but as you look deeper into the mantle, the relationship does not hold true deeper in the mantle for the increased pressures near the transition zone. In cases where Birch's law was applied beyond the transition zone, parts of the formula need to be revised. For higher pressure regimes, different laws may be needed to determine wave velocities.

Determining Birch's law experimentally
The relationship between the density of a material and the velocity of a  moving through the material was noted when research was conducted on waves in different materials.

In the experiment, a pulse of voltage is applied to a circular plate of polarized barium titanate ceramic (the transducer) which is attached to the near end of the material sample. The added voltage creates vibrations in the sample. Those vibrations travel through the sample to a second transducer on the far end. The vibrations are then converted into an electrical wave which is viewed on an oscilloscope to determine the travel time. The velocity is the lender of the damper decided by the wave's travel time.

The resulting relationship between the density of the material and the discovered velocity is known as Birch's law.

Velocity of compressional waves in rocks
The below table shows the velocities for different rocks ranging in pressure from 10 bars to 10,000 bars. It represents the how the change in density, as given in the second column, is related to the velocity of the  moving in the material. An increase in the density of the material leads to an increase in the velocity which can be determined using Birch's Law.

{| class="wikitable collapsible"
|+ Velocities of Compressional Waves in Rocks
|-
!rowspan=2| Rock Type 
!rowspan=2| Rock Location
!rowspan=2| Rock Density 
!colspan=4| Wave Velocity (in km/s)at Pressure:
|-
!10 bar !! 500 bar !! 2000 bar !! 10,000 bar
|-
| Serpentinite || Thetford,Quebec || 2.601 || 5.6 || — || 5.73 || 6.00
|-
| Serpentinite || Ludlow, VT || 2.614 || 4.7 || 6.33 || 6.59 || 6.82
|-
| Granite, “G.I.” || Westerly, RI || 2.619 || 4.1 || 5.63 || 5.97 || 6.23
|-
| Granite || Quincy, MA || 2.621 || 5.1 || 6.04 || 6.20 || 6.45
|-
| Granite || Rockport, MA || 2.624 || 5.0 || 5.96 || 6.29 || 6.51
|-
| Granite || Stone Mt., GA || 2.625 || 3.7 || 5.42 || 6.16 || 6.40
|-
| Granite || Chelmsford,MA || 2.626 || 4.2 || 5.64 || 6.09 || 6.35
|-
| Gneiss || Pelham, MA || 2.643 || 3.4 || 5.67 || 6.06 || 6.31
|-
| Quartz monzonite || Porterville,CA || 2.644 || 5.1 || — || 6.07 || 6.37
|-
| Quartzite || MT || 2.647 || 5.6 || — || 6.15 || 6.35
|-
| Granite || Hyderabad,India || 2.654 || 5.4 || 6.26 || 6.38 || 6.56
|-
| Granite || Barre, VT || 2.655 || 5.1 || 5.86 || 6.15 || 6.39
|-
| Sandstone || NY || 2.659 || 3.9 || 5.0 || 5.44 || 5.85
|-
| Pyrophyllitegranite || SacredHeart, MN || 2.662 || 5.9 || — || 6.28 || 6.45
|-
| Granite || Barriefield,Ontario  || 2.672 || 5.7 || 6.21 || 6.35 || 6.51
|-
| Gneiss || Hell Gate, NY || 2.675 || 5.1 || 6.06 || 6.23 || 6.50
|-
| Granite || Hyderabad,India || 2.676 || 5.7 || — || 6.46 || 6.61
|-
| “Granite” || Englehart,Ontario || 2.679 || 6.1 || 6.28 || 6.37 || 6.57
|-
| Greywacke || New Zealand || 2.679 || 5.4 || 5.63 || 5.87 || 6.13
|-
| “Granite” || Larchford,Ontario || 2.683 || 5.7 || 6.13 || 6.25 || 6.41
|-
| Albite || Sylmar, PA || 2.687 || 6.40 || — || 6.65 || 6.76
|-
| Granodiorite || Butte, MT || 2.705 || 4.4 || — || 6.35 || 6.56
|-
| Graywacke || Quebec || 2.705 || 5.4 || — || 6.04 || 6.28
|-
| Serpentinite || CA || 2.710 || 5.8 || — || 6.08 || 6.31
|-
| Slate || Medford, MA || 2.734 || 5.49 || — || 5.91 || 6.22
|-
| “Charnockite” || Pallavaram,India || 2.740 || 6.15 || — || 6.30 || 6.46
|-
| Granodioritegneiss || NH || 2.758 || 4.4 || — || 6.07 || 6.30
|-
| Tonalite || Val Verde, CA || 2.763 || 5.1 || — || 6.43 || 6.60
|-
| Anorthosite || Tahawus, NY || 2.768 || 6.73 || — || 6.90 || 7.02
|-
| Anorthosite || StillwaterComplex, MT || 2.770 || 6.5 || — || 7.01 || 7.10
|-
| Augite syenite || Ontario || 2.780 || 5.7 || — || 6.63 || 6.79
|-
| Mica schist || Woodsville, VT || 2.797 || 5.7 || — || 6.48 || 6.64
|-
| Serpentinite || Ludlow, VT  || 2.798 || 6.4 || — || 6.57 || 6.84
|-
| Quartz diorite || San Luis Reyquad., CA || 2.798 || 5.1 || — || 6.52 || 6.71
|-
| Anorthosite || BushveldComplex || 2.807 || 5.7 || 6.92 || 7.05 || 7.21
|-
| Chlorite schist || ChesterQuarry, VT || 2.841 || 4.8 || — || 6.82 || 7.07
|-
| Quartz diorite || Dedham, MA || 2.906 || 5.5 || — || 6.53 || 6.71
|-
| Talc schist || Chester, VT || 2.914 || 4.9 || — || 6.50 || 6.97
|-
| Gabbro || Mellen, WI || 2.931 || 6.8 || 7.04 || 7.09 || 7.21
|-
| Diabase || Centerville,VA || 2.976 || 6.14 || — || 6.76 || 6.93
|-
| Diabase || Holyoke, MA || 2.977 || 6.25 || 6.40 || 6.47 || 6.63
|-
| Norite || Pertoria,Transvaal || 2.978 || 6.6 || 7.02 || 7.11 || 7.28
|-
| Dunite || Webster, NC || 2.980 || 6.0 || — || 6.46 || 6.79
|-
| Diabase || Sudbury,Ontario || 3.003 || 6.4 || 6.67 || 6.76 || 6.91
|-
| Diabase || Frederick, MD || 3.012 || 6.76 || — || 6.80 || 6.92
|-
| Gabbro || FrenchCreek, PA || 3.054 || 5.8 || 6.74 || 7.02 || 7.23
|-
| Amphibolite || Madison Co.,MT || 3.120 || 6.89 || — || 7.12 || 7.35
|-
| Jadeite || Japan || 3.180 || 7.6 || — || 8.22 || 8.28
|-
| Actinoliterschist || Chester, VT || 3.194 || 6.61 || — || 7.20 || 7.54
|-
| Dunite || Webster, NC  || 3.244 || 7.0 || — || 7.59 || 7.78
|-
| Pyroxenite || Sonoma Co.,CA || 3.247 || 6.8 || — || 7.79 || 8.01
|-
| Dunite || Mt. Dun,New Zealand  || 3.258 || 7.5 || 7.69 || 7.80 || 8.00
|-
| Dunite || BalsamGap, NC || 3.267 || 7.0 || 7.82 || 8.01 || 8.28
|-
| Bronzitite || StillwaterComplex, MT || 3.279 || 7.42 || — || 7.65 || 7.83
|-
| Dunite || Addie, NC || 3.304 || 7.70 || — || 8.05 || 8.28
|-
| Dunite || Twin SistersPeaks, WA || 3.312 || 7.7 || 8.11 || 8.27 || 8.42
|-
| Eclogite || Tanganyika || 3.328 || 6.64 || 7.30 || 7.46 || 7.71
|-
| Jadeite || Burma || 3.331 || 8.45 || — || 8.69 || 8.78
|-
| Harzburgite || BushveldComplex || 3.369 || 6.9 || 7.74 || 7.81 || 7.95
|-
| Eclogite || Kimberley || 3.376 || 7.17 || 7.65 || 7.73 || 7.87
|-
| Eclogite || Sunnmore,Norway || 3.376 || 5.2 || — || 7.30 || 7.69
|-
| Eclogite || Healdsburg,CA || 3.441 || 7.31 || — || 7.81 || 8.01
|-
| Garnet || CT  || 3.561 || 6.3 || — || 8.55 || 8.99
|-
| Dunite || MoonihoekMine,Transvaal || 3.744 || 6.7 || 7.13 || 7.21 || 7.36
|}

See also
Archie's law
Byerlee's law

References

Geophysics